ENL is a broad-based conglomerate with interests in most sectors of the Mauritius economy listed on the Stock Exchange of Mauritius. It operates in Agro-industry, Real Estate, Hospitality, Logistics, Fintech, Commerce and Industry sectors with a diverse portfolio of more than 120 brands and employs over 7,000 people. 

ENL subsidiaries generated Rs 12.2 billion (Around US$330 million) in turnover during financial year ended June 2015 and directly employed more than 6800 people.

History  
The group traces its beginnings in 1821 when Martial Henri Noël bought  of agricultural land from his siblings. In 1827, he purchased an additional  and built the Mon Desert sugar factory. 

In 1882, the Noël family invested in the Savannah sugar estate in the south of the island, giving them access to another  of land.

Espitalier-Noël Ltd was incorporated in 1944 as a holding company to administer its two sugar estates. In 1966, it participated in the creation of the Food and Allied Group (of which ENL Investment still holds 49%).

In 1969, Espitalier Noel Ltd created the General Investment and Development Company Ltd (GIDC – now ENL Commercial) to invest in non-sugar related activities.

The company's predecessors (Savannah and Mon Desert Alma sugar estates and GIDC) were among the first companies listed on the newly created Mauritius Stock Exchange in 1989.

Bagatelle Mall By Ascencia  
The Bagatelle Mall is a commercial center inaugurated in 2011 developed and operated by ENL Property in partnership with South Africa's Atterbury Investment Group. 

The first phase (of the planned three) stretches over 42,000 square metres and needed an investment of MUR 3.1 billion (approx. US$85 million in 2015). It includes over 140 shopping outlets, a food court and restaurants, a brewery in the name of Flying Dodo Brewing Company, cinemas and a hotel.

An extension of 9,000 square metres, developed at a cost of MUR 500 million (approx. US$13 million in 2015), was opened in 2015

See also
Economy of Mauritius
List of Mauritian companies

References

Conglomerate companies of Mauritius